John Thomas Elfvin (June 30, 1917 – January 6, 2009) was an American lawyer and jurist who served as a United States district judge of the United States District Court for the Western District of New York.

Early life and education

Born in Montour Falls, New York, Elfvin received his Bachelor of Electrical Engineering degree from Cornell University in 1942 and was a member of Phi Kappa Tau fraternity there. He earned his Juris Doctor in 1947 from the Georgetown Law following service in the United States Navy as an electrical engineer in the Bureau of Ships during World War II, from 1943 to 1946.

Career

Elfvin clerked for Judge E. Barrett Prettyman of the United States Court of Appeals for the District of Columbia Circuit from 1947 to 1948. After private practice in New York City at Cravath, Swaine & Moore and for several firms in Buffalo, New York, he served three years as Assistant United States Attorney from 1955 to 1958. He returned to private practice in Buffalo from 1958 to 1969 during which time he was a member of the Board of Supervisors for Erie County, New York, a member of the Buffalo Common Council. He served as the Minority Leader in 1966. Elfvin served one year on the Supreme Court of New York in 1969 and returned to private practice before becoming United States Attorney for the Western District of New York in 1972.

Federal judicial service

On December 9, 1974, Elfvin was nominated by President Gerald Ford to a seat on the United States District Court for the Western District of New York vacated by Judge John Oliver Henderson. Elfvin was confirmed by the United States Senate on December 20, 1974, and received his commission the following day. Elfvin assumed senior status on July 1, 1987, and took inactive senior status, on October 5, 2007, meaning that while he remained a federal judge, he no longer heard cases or participated in the business of the court.

Death

Elfvin died January 6, 2009, at a Lancaster, New York nursing home. He was survived by his wife (since 1960), the former Peggy Pierce, who died in 2012.

References

Sources
 Herbeck, Dan. Retired federal Judge John T. Elfvin dies at 90. The Buffalo News. 6 January 2009.
 

1917 births
2009 deaths
United States Navy personnel of World War II
Assistant United States Attorneys
Cornell University College of Engineering alumni
County legislators in New York (state)
Georgetown University Law Center alumni
Judges of the United States District Court for the Western District of New York
New York (state) city council members
Lawyers from Buffalo, New York
People from Lancaster, New York
People from Montour Falls, New York
United States Attorneys for the Western District of New York
United States district court judges appointed by Gerald Ford
20th-century American judges
United States Navy sailors
New York Supreme Court Justices